Trolle is a surname which is common in the Scandinavian countries. People with the surname include:

 Alice Trolle-Wachtmeister (1926–2017), courtier at the Royal Court of Sweden
 Ane Trolle (born 1979), Danish musician
 Brent Trolle (born 1947), New Zealand artist 
 Eric Trolle (1863–1934), Swedish diplomat and governor
 Henrik af Trolle (1730–1784), Swedish naval officer 
 Herluf Trolle (1516–1565), Danish admiral
 Michel Trollé (born 1959), French racing driver 
 Orvar Trolle (1900–1971), Swedish swimmer
 Rolf Trolle Andersen (born 1945), Norwegian diplomat

See also
 Trolle, Scanian  noble family

Swedish-language surnames
Danish-language surnames